Events in the year 2022 in Spain.

Incumbents 
 Monarch: Felipe VI
 Prime Minister: Pedro Sánchez
 President of the Congress of Deputies: Meritxell Batet
 President of the Senate of Spain: Ander Gil
 President of the Supreme Court: Carlos Lesmes
 President of the Constitutional Court: Pedro González-Trevijano
 Attorney General: Dolores Delgado
 Chief of the Defence Staff: Teodoro Esteban López Calderón
 Sánchez II Government

Regional presidents 

 Andalusia: Juan Manuel Moreno Bonilla
 Aragón: Javier Lambán
 Asturias: Adrián Barbón
 Balearic Islands: Francina Armengol
 Basque Country: Iñigo Urkullu
 Canary Islands: Ángel Víctor Torres
 Cantabria: Miguel Ángel Revilla
 Castilla–La Mancha: Emiliano García-Page
 Castile and León: Alfonso Fernández Mañueco
 Catalonia: Pere Aragonès
 Extremadura: Guillermo Fernández Vara
 Galicia: Alberto Núñez Feijóo
 La Rioja: Concha Andreu
 Community of Madrid: Isabel Díaz Ayuso
 Region of Murcia: Fernando López Miras
 Navarre: María Chivite
 Valencian Community: Ximo Puig
 Ceuta: Juan Jesús Vivas
 Melilla: Eduardo de Castro

Events 
Ongoing — COVID-19 pandemic in Spain (Until 1 August)

January 
 5 January – Sara Alba is dismissed as Minister of Health of La Rioja in the Government of Concha Andreu.
 19 January – Six people are killed in a fire at a nursing home in Moncada, Valencia.

February 
 13 February - The far-right Vox party comes third in the 2022 Castilian-Leonese regional election, raising its representation from 1 up to 13 seats, and becoming the key player for the rival People's Party (PP), who won the elections, to form a government. Following this election result, and an unfolding leadership crisis in PP, Vox for the first time was recognized as the Spain's second political force, according to some opinion polls for the next general elections.

March 
 10 March - Vox forms a government with the People's Party in Castile and León, taking three of ten ministerial positions including vice president for regional leader Juan García-Gallardo. This is the first time that Vox forms a part of a government in Spain and the first time that a far-right party is in government since the 1970s. Vox member Carlos Pollán was elected President of the Cortes of Castile and León, the position of speaker.

May 
 6 May - 2022 Madrid explosion: Two people are killed and eighteen others are injured after a gas leak-caused explosion in Madrid.

June 
 13 June - Vila-seca train crash
 28–30 June - 2022 NATO Madrid summit

August 
 1 August - Spain is alongside Portugal who both transition to the endemic phase.

October 

 16 October - At least seven people are injured in a suspected gas explosion at a Japanese restaurant in Tarragona, Spain.

Deaths

16 July, Carlos Pérez de Bricio, Spanish businessman and politician (born 1927)

References 

 
Spain
Spain
2020s in Spain
Years of the 21st century in Spain